A highly competitive sports rivalry that exists between the national under-20 ice hockey teams of the two countries, as well as their respective sets of fans. The two countries are perennial rivals at the World Junior Championships for players under 20 years of age. Overall, Canada holds a total of 20 gold medals, while the United States holds five gold medals.

On December 29, 2017, the two teams played each other outdoors at New Era Field in Orchard Park, New York, during the 2018 World Junior Championships. The U.S. won the game 4–3 over Canada in a game-winning shootout. This was the first outdoor game held at any top-level IIHF World Championship.

List of matches

Statistics
Last match update: January 4, 2023

Matches
Legend

 – Canada win
 – Canada OT win
 – Tie

 – USA win
 – USA OT win

See also
Canada men's national junior ice hockey team
Canada–United States sports rivalries
United States men's national junior ice hockey team

References

Canada men's national junior ice hockey team
Canada–United States relations
Ice hockey rivalries
United States national junior ice hockey team
International sports rivalries